Paul Daniel Coll  (born 9 May 1992) is a professional squash player from New Zealand. In March 2022, he became the first New Zealand man to achieve a world ranking of World No. 1. He is the current British Open champion, having won this tournament in 2021 and 2022

While Coll never achieved the same success in his junior career that he would see at the professional level, his first major breakthrough came when he was ranked 31st in the world and won the $100,000 St. George's Hill Classic in Weybridge, England, as a qualifier. He beat 4 players in the top 20 to win the title, which raised him to no. 20 in the world. He made history in September 2017 when he became no. 10 in the PSA World Rankings. He is only the fourth New Zealander to break the top 10 in the world, the ones before him, including former world champion and world no. 2 Ross Norman.

Coll claimed his first Commonwealth Games medal at the 2018 Commonwealth Games as he clinched a silver medal in the men's singles event after being defeated by veteran English squash player, James Willstrop. On the other side, fellow New Zealand squash player, Joelle King clinched a historical gold medal in the women's singles event. This was also the first instance where a male and a female squash player from New Zealand had managed to qualify in the final of the respective events at a Commonwealth Games event.

In September 2019, Coll won the 2019 Open De France Nantes in France. Coll was able to take the final in three games (12–10, 11–3, 11–9), defeating Joel Makin. On 22 August 2021, Paul Coll won the British Open championship and became the first New Zealander to win the British Open men's squash title.

In March 2022, Coll became the first New Zealander men's world no. 1 squash player, surpassing Ross Norman as the highest-ranked male squash player from New Zealand. Coll enjoyed more success in March when he won his first Windy City Open title in Chicago after coming back from two games down against Youssef Ibrahim of Egypt. The next month in April, he successfully defended his 2021 British Open title without dropping a single set the entire tournament. He defeated Ali Farag in a repeat of the 2021 final.

In August 2022, Coll took home his first gold medal in the men's singles event at the 2022 Commonwealth Games and became the first New Zealander to win gold in this event after beating Welshman Joel Makin in a tight five-game contest.

In the 2023 New Year Honours, Coll was appointed an Officer of the New Zealand Order of Merit, for services to squash.

Personal life
Coll's uncle was the New Zealand rugby league player Tony Coll.

Coll is currently in a relationship with Belgian professional squash player Nele Gilis.

References

External links 
 
 
 
 

1992 births
Living people
New Zealand male squash players
Commonwealth Games silver medallists for New Zealand
Commonwealth Games bronze medallists for New Zealand
Commonwealth Games medallists in squash
Squash players at the 2014 Commonwealth Games
Squash players at the 2018 Commonwealth Games
Sportspeople from Greymouth
People educated at Christchurch Boys' High School
20th-century New Zealand people
21st-century New Zealand people
Squash players at the 2022 Commonwealth Games
Officers of the New Zealand Order of Merit
Medallists at the 2018 Commonwealth Games
Medallists at the 2022 Commonwealth Games